Arbanitis ornatus is a species of armoured trap-door spider in the family Idiopidae, and is endemic to Queensland. 

It was first described by William Joseph Rainbow in 1914 as Idioctis ornata. In 1977, Barbara Main transferred it to the genus, Dyarcyops.  In 2017, Michael Rix and others transferred it to the genus, Arbanitis.

References

Idiopidae
Spiders described in 1914
Spiders of Australia
Fauna of Queensland
Taxa named by William Joseph Rainbow